Balfour Collegiate is a public high school in Regina, Saskatchewan, Canada, named after the city's former mayor, James Balfour. A part of Regina Public Schools, it officially opened on September 2, 1930. It is located in the Core Group neighbourhood of central Regina. Originally a technical school (with an attached commercial high school), Balfour was given official collegiate status in 1984 due to the closure of nearby Central Collegiate Institute.

Balfour Collegiate was chosen in 1995 as an exemplary secondary school by the Canadian Education Association.

Its feeder schools include Arcola Community School, Douglas Park School, Thomson Community School, Wascana Plains School, and W.F. Ready School.

Activities
Art Club
Athletic Trainers
Canteen Staff
Concert Band/Choir
Dances
Diversity Day
Fall and Spring Productions
Improv
Jazz Ensemble
Library Club
Outdoor Club
Peer Support
Red Cross
SADD
Science Club
Seniors' Night
Student Rep. Council
Vocal Jazz Ensemble
Weightlifting Club
Wellness Committee
Yearbook

Athletics
Badminton
Baseball
Basketball
Cross-country running
Curling
Cheer and Dance
Football
Golf
Hockey
Soccer
Softball
Track and Field
Volleyball
Wrestling

Notable alumni
Lloyd Ailsby, hockey player
Paul Dojack, CFL referee
Dunc Fisher, hockey player

Affiliated communities
Al Ritchie (pop. 7860)
Arcola East - North (pop. 9995)
Arcola East - South (pop. 7665)
Boothill (pop. 2765)
Core Group (pop. 4430)
Eastview (pop. 1555)
Gladmer Park (pop. 1470)

References
Argan, William, Pamela Cowan and Gordon W. Staseson (2003). "Regina: The First 100 Years." Leader Post Carrier Foundation Inc., 133.

External links
Balfour Collegiate website

High schools in Regina, Saskatchewan
Educational institutions established in 1930
1930 establishments in Saskatchewan